Karolin may refer to:

Places
Karolin, a neighbourhood and power plant in the Nowe Miasto district of Poznań
Karolin, Greater Poland Voivodeship (west-central Poland)
Karolin, Kuyavian-Pomeranian Voivodeship (north-central Poland)
Karolin, Gmina Garbów in Lublin Voivodeship (east Poland)
Karolin, Gmina Zakrzew in Lublin Voivodeship (east Poland)
Karolin, Łęczna County in Lublin Voivodeship (east Poland)
Karolin, Białobrzegi County in Masovian Voivodeship (east-central Poland)
Karolin, Zwoleń County in Masovian Voivodeship (east-central Poland)
Karolin, Podlaskie Voivodeship (north-east Poland)
Karolin, Pomeranian Voivodeship (north Poland)
Karolin, an island in the novel The Garden of God

People
Karolin (name)

See also

Karolina (disambiguation)